Gateway High School is a Christian, co-educational, independent school in Emerald Hill, Harare, Zimbabwe. It has 700 students from Form 1 to Upper 6. The school had its first form 1 intake in 1991 and the first upper 6 class graduated in 1995 under the headship of Paul Revell, along with Marcus Chibisa and Ron Montague as his deputies. The school is located on Sam Nujoma Street (previously Golden Stairs Road and Second Street Extension).

Gateway High School is a member of the Association of Trust Schools (ATS) and the Headmaster is a member of the Conference of Heads of Independent Schools in Zimbabwe (CHISZ). The school prepares students for the Cambridge IGCSE and A-Level examinations.

Gateway High School was named in 2003 in the top twenty best high schools in Africa, based upon quality of education, student engagement, strength and activities of old boys and old girls, school profile, internet and news visibility. Gateway was also ranked as one of the Top 10 High Schools in Zimbabwe in 2014.

Images

See also

 List of schools in Zimbabwe

References

External links

 Gateway High School Official website
 Gateway Alumni

Schools in Harare
High schools in Zimbabwe
Day schools in Zimbabwe
Private schools in Zimbabwe
Co-educational schools in Zimbabwe
Cambridge schools in Zimbabwe
Educational institutions established in 1991
1991 establishments in Zimbabwe
Member schools of the Association of Trust Schools